Song Bum-keun (born 15 October 1997) is a South Korean professional footballer who plays as a goalkeeper for J1 League club, Shonan Bellmare and the South Korea national team.

Club career

Jeonbuk Hyundai Motors
On 20 February 2018, Song made his professional debut in 2018 AFC Champions League against Kitchee SC.

Shonan Bellmare
On 18 December 2022, Song officially joined Japanese side Shonan Bellmare on a permanent transfer.

Career statistics
.

Notes

Honours

Club
Jeonbuk Hyundai Motors
K League 1: 2018, 2019, 2020, 2021
KFA Cup: 2020,  2022

International
South Korea U23
Asian Games: 2018
AFC U-23 Championship: 2020

Individual
 AFC U-23 Championship Best Goalkeeper: 2020

References

External links 
 
 

1997 births
Living people
Place of birth missing (living people)
South Korean footballers
Association football goalkeepers
People from Seongnam
Korea University alumni
Jeonbuk Hyundai Motors players
K League 1 players
Shonan Bellmare players
J1 League players
South Korea under-20 international footballers
South Korea under-23 international footballers
South Korea international footballers
Footballers at the 2018 Asian Games
Asian Games medalists in football
Asian Games gold medalists for South Korea
Medalists at the 2018 Asian Games
Footballers at the 2020 Summer Olympics
Olympic footballers of South Korea
Sportspeople from Gyeonggi Province
2022 FIFA World Cup players